Luis Otero was an Argentine film actor. He appeared in more than thirty films including Dark River (1952).

Selected filmography
 Savage Pampas (1945)
 Lost Kisses (1945)
 Story of a Bad Woman (1948)
 Don't Ever Open That Door (1952)
 Dark River (1952)
 The Black Market (1953)

References

Bibliography 
 Hammer, Tad. International film prizes: an encyclopedia. Garland, 1991.

External links 
 

Year of birth unknown
Year of death unknown
Argentine male film actors
People from Buenos Aires
20th-century Argentine male actors